The Wuxi dialect (Simplified Chinese: 无锡话; Traditional Chinese: 無錫話; Pinyin: Wúxīhuà, Wu : mu1 sik1 wo3 , Wuxi dialect  : [vu˨˨˧ siɪʔ˦ ɦu˨]) is a dialect of Wu. It is spoken in the city of Wuxi in Jiangsu province, China.

It has many similarities with Shanghainese and the Suzhou dialect. It is mutually intelligible with the Changzhou dialect to which it is most closely related. It is not at all mutually intelligible with Mandarin, China's official language.

References

External links

Television hosts discuss differences between Wuxi and Suzhou dialects (YouTube)

Wu Chinese